The following table gives detailed results of the games played by Liverpool Football Club in international football competitions (European Cup/UEFA Champions League, UEFA Cup/Europa League, Inter-Cities Fairs Cup, European/UEFA Cup Winners' Cup, European/UEFA Super Cup, Intercontinental Cup and FIFA Club World Championship/Club World Cup).

List of matches
Note: Liverpool score always listed first.
 

Last updated: 15 March 2023

External links

 Official Liverpool FC website
 Official UEFA site

English football clubs in international competitions
Liverpool F.C.